Responsible Research and Innovation (RRI) is a term used by the European Union's Framework Programmes to describe scientific research and technological development processes that take into account effects and potential impacts on the environment and society. It gained visibility around the year 2010, arising from predecessors including "ELSA" (Ethical, Legal and Social Aspects) studies prompted by the Human Genome Project. Various slightly different definitions of RRI emerged, but all of them agree that societal challenges should be a primary focus of scientific research, and moreover they agree upon the methods by which that goal should be achieved. RRI involves holding research to high ethical standards, ensuring gender equality in the scientific community, investing policy-makers with the responsibility to avoid harmful effects of innovation, engaging the communities affected by innovation and ensuring that they have the knowledge necessary to understand the implications by furthering science education and Open Access. Organizations that adopted the RRI terminology include the Engineering and Physical Sciences Research Council. 

"Horizon 2020", the European Commission's program for science funding announced in 2013, made RRI a main focus. The foundations for this were laid in the program "Societally Responsible Innovating", which was an initiative of Netherlands Organization for Scientific research and six ministerial departments in the Netherlands. The 2005-2007 preparations for this program coined the phrase “Responsible Innovation” and designed a program with several calls for proposals. The core idea of Responsible Research and Innovation in the EU Horizon 2020 Program was inspired by this program.

In 2014, it was suggested that the "broader impacts" criteria of the National Science Foundation were, despite certain dissimilarities, in effect coming to resemble RRI standards.

There are many industries and services that involve research and development and specifically highlight the need and importance of responsible research to make that development most beneficial to all of its stake holders including the society linked with it. Commercial agriculture is one such industry among others that is heavily dependent on responsible research development.

One area in which RRI principles are being applied is quantum computing. A research collaboration led by Oxford University within the UK National Quantum Technologies Programme aims to reveal how quantum computing can be socially and economically transformative, and to identify the potential downsides of the "disruption" it might bring about.

Among the criticisms voiced about RRI, prominent concerns include the vagueness of the terminology, the possibility of discouraging blue skies research and the lack of sufficient practical reward for embracing RRI in a research culture based on competition and short-term contracts.

References

External links 
 Responsible Research and Innovation at EuroScience
 
Social responsibility
Research and development